Gingindlovu is a town in Uthungulu District Municipality in the KwaZulu-Natal province of South Africa.

Village 21 km south-east of Eshowe. The name was first applied to one of Cetshwayo's military kraals nearby. Of Zulu origin, it is said to mean 'place of the big elephant' or, more possibly, 'swallower of the elephant', referring to Cetshwayo's victory over his brother Mbulazi in 1856.

References

Populated places in the uMlalazi Local Municipality